Inxent is a commune in the Pas-de-Calais department in the Hauts-de-France region of France.

Geography
A small village situated some 5 miles (8 km) north of Montreuil-sur-Mer on the D127 road, in the valley of the river Course.

Population

Places of interest
 The church of the Nativité-de-Notre-Dame, dating from the thirteenth century.
 A partially restored watermill.

See also
Communes of the Pas-de-Calais department

References

Communes of Pas-de-Calais